Nightwalker is the seventh studio album by Canadian singer Gino Vannelli. The album was released in 1981, featuring the title track, which reached No. 41 in the U.S., and "Living Inside Myself", which reached No. 6 in the U.S. and No. 13 in Canada.  The title track was used as the theme to KVEO-TV's (Brownsville-McAllen, Texas) local newscasts in the early 1980s.

Track listing

Personnel 
 Gino Vannelli – lead and backing vocals
 Joe Vannelli – electric piano, acoustic piano, organ, synthesizers, string arrangements
 Mike Miller – electric guitars, acoustic guitar
 Neil Stubenhaus – bass
 Vinnie Colaiuta – drums
 Mike Fisher – congas, percussion
 David Boruff – saxophone
 Brad Cole – string arrangements
 Doug Parry – backing vocals
 Stephanie Spruill – backing vocals
 Ross Vannelli – backing vocals
 Julia Waters – backing vocals
 Maxine Waters – backing vocals

Production 
 Norm Kinney – engineer
 Doug Parry – assistant engineer
 Rick Romano – assistant engineer
 Bernie Grundman – mastering
 Ria Lewerke – art direction, design 
 Mark Hanauer – photography

References

External links
 

Gino Vannelli albums
1981 albums
Arista Records albums